The Coolpix 8700 was a digital camera manufactured and distributed by Nikon. It was introduced in 2004. It featured 8.0 megapixels (effective), and a 8x optical/4x digital zoom. It was part of the Nikon Coolpix line of cameras.

External links
 Digital Review

8700
Cameras introduced in 2004